Liberty Airport may refer to:

Newark Liberty International Airport in Newark, New Jersey, United States
Liberty Municipal Airport in Liberty, Texas, United States

See also
 Liberty County Airport (disambiguation)